Adrián Alonso Barona (born April 6, 1994) is a Mexican actor. As a child actor, he was best known for the movie The Legend of Zorro.

Life and career
In 2005 he played Zorro's son in the Columbia Pictures movie The Legend of Zorro, featuring Antonio Banderas and Catherine Zeta-Jones.

In 2007, he participated in the One Long Night film tells of David Siqueiros, and fully bilingual film produced in Mexico. That same year, he was called by Patricia Riggen to co-star alongside Eugenio Derbez and Kate del Castillo in Under the Same Moon (La misma luna) in 2007. He also had a small role in Casi Divas of Issa Lopez, released in 2008.

Between 2013 and 2018 he held roles in two television series, HBO Latino's Sr. Ávila and Televisa's Como dice el dicho.

Filmography

References

External links 
 

Living people
1994 births
21st-century Mexican male actors
Mexican male child actors
Mexican male film actors
Mexican male television actors
Male actors from Mexico City